John Aloysius Blake (1826 – 22 May 1887) was an Irish nationalist politician and Member of Parliament. He sat in the House of Commons of the United Kingdom of Great Britain and Ireland for Waterford County, Waterford City and Carlow County.

Blake was elected for Waterford City in 1857 and remained as member for that constituency until 1869; from 1880 to 1884 he was member for County Waterford; and in 1886 he was elected unopposed for County Carlow, in a by-election and held the seat, again unopposed, in the general election later that year.

Described as "one of the most moderate members of the Irish Nationalist party", Blake was chairman of the Fishery Harbours Commission for Ireland. He took an interest in issues of mental health, and wrote pamphlets urging improvements in the treatment of the mentally ill.

References

External links 
 
 Works by John Aloysius Blake in the National Library of Ireland

1826 births
1887 deaths
Irish Parliamentary Party MPs
Members of the Parliament of the United Kingdom for County Carlow constituencies (1801–1922)
Members of the Parliament of the United Kingdom for County Waterford constituencies (1801–1922)
UK MPs 1857–1859
UK MPs 1859–1865
UK MPs 1865–1868
UK MPs 1868–1874
UK MPs 1880–1885
UK MPs 1886–1892